E.P.idemic is Craig's Brother's second EP released on July 9, 2004 through Takeover Records.

Track listing
"10,000" – 2:54
"Bad Marriage" 3:43
"Long Way" 3:08
"E.P.issdumbology" 4:23
"Flag Down" 3:23

Personnel
Ted Bond – vocals
Mike Green – producer
Scott Hrapoff – bass
Heath Konkel – drums, vocals
Steven Neufeld – vocals
Sam Prather – guitar, vocals

Craig's Brother albums
2004 EPs
Albums produced by Mike Green (record producer)